Szatmárcseke  is a village in Szabolcs-Szatmár-Bereg county, in the Northern Great Plain region of eastern Hungary.

Geography
It lies at a distance of 94 km from Nyíregyháza,  29 km from Vásárosnamény, 17 km from Fehérgyarmat, 18 km from Tiszabecs, and 11 km from Tiszacsécse.

History
The first written mention of the village arose in 1181 as Cseke. This time it was a thriving village that owned a church.

References

Populated places in Szabolcs-Szatmár-Bereg County